Logicraft was an American software company. The company's products enabled Digital Equipment Corporation (DEC) minicomputers to run PC software (such as Lotus-123).

Overview
Augmenting a DEC VAX or PDP-11 multi-user minicomputer with a Logicraft MS-DOS "card" that itself is multi-user allowed a person sitting at a simple terminal to run PC applications. This provided "controlled access to PC resources without putting both a PC and a VT terminal on every desk top."  As of mid-1988, Logicraft and another firm, Virtual Microsystems Inc (VMI) were "the only commercially available products that let VAX/VMS systems run standard off-the-shelf PC applications from terminals and VAXstations."

Logicraft's Omniware was a combined hardware/software offering. Some users went beyond running PC applications and used serially shared CD-ROM access.

References

Defunct software companies of the United States